María Antonieta "Calú" Gutiérrez is a Venezuelan telenovelas screenwriter. After starting her career in her home country, she moved to Mexico to adapt classic novels, also known as rose novels, in modern versions for Televisa. She is considered as a disciple of Carlos Romero and Alberto Gómez.

Personal life 
Gutiérrez is the daughter of the screenwriter María Antonieta Gómez.

References

External links
 

Venezuelan women writers
Telenovela writers
Women soap opera writers